Akören is a village in the District of Aladağ, Adana Province, Turkey. It currently is a neighbourhood of the Municipality of Aladağ, with Halil Yılmaz as its muhtar as of 2016. In 2021, it had a population of 893.

History 
The village is known to have existed in the ancient Roman times. The ruins of this ancient settlement still exists and the village is an officially classified as an archaeological site. The site hosts four surviving churches and avenues. The settlement consists of two separate neighbourhoods, one with around 30 houses called Akören 1 or Göveren, other with around 50 houses called Akören 2. Akören 1 encompasses a Byzantine church at the centre of the village, on which the date 572 is inscribed. This part hosts several historic stones, some of which were used in the extraction of oils. In the northwest of Akören 2 lies another church and a number of inscriptions and a Byzantine graveyard with burial chambers. On one inscription, the date of 170 AD is written.

In 1928, the village was known as "Akevren". By 1946, the name of the village had changed to "Akören".

Geography 
The village is located 20 km away from Aladağ and 81 km from the city of Adana. It is located in the Taurus Mountains.

Politics 
The village was a municipality until the 2013 Turkish local government reorganisation with Ahmet Solaklıoğlu of AK Parti as mayor. The following is a list of mayors:
 1989-1994: Ömer Tekin
 1994–1999: İsmet Erkan
 1999–2013: Ahmet Solaklıoğlu

In the local elections of 1989, Ömer Tekin of the True Path Party (DYP) won the mayoralty with a mandate of 53.37%, against the candidate of the Motherland Party (ANAP), who received 44.83% of the votes. In local elections of 1994, ANAP took the mayoralty with İsmet Erkan gaining 56.86% of the votes, against the candidate of DYP who had a vote share of 39.33%. In 1999, Ahmet Solaklıoğlu retook the municipality for DYP with 29.69% of the votes. The Republican People's Party (CHP) got the second place with 24.11%, the Nationalist Movement Party (MHP) received 18.77% and came third, the Democratic Left Party (DSP) came joint fourth with ANAP, both getting 12.61% of the votes.

References

External links

Villages in Aladağ District